The 2009 European Parliament election in Portugal was the election of the delegation from Portugal to the European Parliament held on 7 June 2009.

The election was a huge setback for the Socialist Party (PS), which lost almost 18 percentage points. Basically all predictions that said that the PS would win comfortably the election, were wrong. As a result, the party also lost five of its twelve European Parliament members. The Social Democrats (PSD) were the big winners in these elections, surprising pundits and analysts who predicted a very complicated result for the PSD leader, Manuela Ferreira Leite. The PSD won 31.7% of the vote and 8 seats. It was the first victory of the PSD, in European elections, since 1989. The People's Party (CDS-PP) also had a surprising result, winning 8% of the vote and electing two European Parliament members. Both PSD and CDS-PP, who ran in a joint list in 2004, increased sharply their scores and together they won more than 40% of the vote and 10 European Parliament members.

On the left, both the Left Bloc (BE) and Democratic Unity Coalition (CDU) achieved very good results with the historic fact that BE surpassed CDU in term of votes and seats for the first time, although only just. Both parties increased their scores at the expense of the Socialist Party. The Left Bloc won 10.7% of the vote and three European Parliament members, their best score in EU elections to date, and CDU surpassed once again the 10% mark winning 10.6% of the vote, but maintaining the two European Parliament members they got in 2004.

Turnout in the elections was quite low, as only 36.78% of the electorate cast a ballot, a slightly lower share than in the 2004 election. Although the number of ballots cast was higher than in 2004, the number of registered voters increased considerably in these elections, making the final turnout share lower than in 2004.

Electoral system 
The voting method used, for the election of European members of parliament, is by proportional representation using the d'Hondt method, which is known to benefit leading parties. In the 2009 European Union elections, Portugal had 22 seats to be filled. Deputies are elected in a single constituency, corresponding to the entire national territory.

Parties and candidates 

The lists were headed by
 Socialist Party (Partido Socialista, PS): Vital Moreira
 Social Democratic Party (Partido Social Democrata, PSD): Paulo Rangel
 Democratic Unity Coalition (Coligação Democrática Unitária, CDU): Ilda Figueiredo
 CDS – People's Party (CDS – Partido Popular, CDS–PP): Nuno Melo
 Left Bloc (Bloco de Esquerda, BE): Miguel Portas
 Portuguese Workers' Communist Party/Reorganized Movement of the Party of the Proletariat (Partido Comunista dos Trabalhadores Portugueses / Movimento Reorganizativo do Partido do Proletariado, PCTP/MRPP): Orlando Alves
 Earth Party (Partido da Terra, MPT): Pedro Quartin Graça
 Hope for Portugal Movement (Movimento Esperança Portugal, MEP): Laurinda Alves
 People's Monarchist Party (Partido Popular Monárquico, PPM): Frederico Carvalho
 Merit and Society Movement (Movimento Mérito e Sociedade, MMS): Carlos Gomes
 National Renovator Party (Partido Nacional Renovador, PNR): Humberto Nuno de Oliveira
 Humanist Party (Partido Humanista, PH): Manuela Magno
 Workers Party of Socialist Unity (Partido Operário de Unidade Socialista, POUS): Carmelinda Pereira

Opinion polling and preliminary exit polls 
Exit polls from the three major television networks in Portugal, RTP1, SIC and TVI were given precisely at 20:00 pm (local time) on 7 June 2009.

Results 

|-
! style="background-color:#E9E9E9;text-align:left;" colspan=2 |National party
! style="background-color:#E9E9E9;text-align:left;" |Europeanparty
! style="background-color:#E9E9E9;text-align:left;" |Main candidate
! style="background-color:#E9E9E9;text-align:right;" |Votes
! style="background-color:#E9E9E9;text-align:right;" |%
! style="background-color:#E9E9E9;text-align:right;" |+/–
! style="background-color:#E9E9E9;text-align:right;" |Seats
! style="background-color:#E9E9E9;text-align:right;" |+/–
|- style="text-align:right;"
| style="background-color: " width=5px|
| style="text-align:left;" | Social Democratic Party (PSD)
| style="text-align:left;" | EPP
| style="text-align:left;" | Paulo Rangel
| 1,131,744
| 31.71
| 
! 8
| 1 
|- style="text-align:right;"
| style="background-color: " width=5px|
| style="text-align:left;" | Socialist Party (PS)
| style="text-align:left;" | PES
| style="text-align:left;" | Vital Moreira
| 946,818	 
| 26.53
| 17.99 
! 7
| 5 
|- style="text-align:right;"
| style="background-color: " width=5px|
| style="text-align:left;" | Left Bloc (BE)
| style="text-align:left;" | EACL / PEL
| style="text-align:left;" | Miguel Portas
| 382,667	
| 10.72
| 5.81 
! 3
| 2 
|- style="text-align:right;"
| style="background-color: " width=5px|
| style="text-align:left;" | Democratic Unitarian Coalition (CDU) • Communist Party (PCP)• Ecologist Party (PEV)
| style="text-align:left;vertical-align:top;" |GUE/NGL
| style="text-align:left;vertical-align:top;" | Ilda Figueiredo
| style="vertical-align:top;" |379,787
| style="vertical-align:top;" |10.64
| style="vertical-align:top;" |1.55 
! 220
| 0 0 
|- style="text-align:right;"
| style="background-color: " width=5px|
| style="text-align:left;" | People's Party (CDS–PP)
| style="text-align:left;" | EPP
| style="text-align:left;" | Nuno Melo
| 298,423	
| 8.36
| 
! 2
| 0 
|- style="text-align:right;"
| style="background-color: " width=5px|
| style="text-align:left;" | Hope for Portugal Movement (MEP)
| style="text-align:left;" | None
| style="text-align:left;" | Laurinda Alves
| 55,072	
| 1.54
| new
! 0
| new
|- style="text-align:right;"
| style="background-color: " width=5px|
| style="text-align:left;" | Workers' Communist Party (PCTP/MRPP)
| style="text-align:left;" | None
| style="text-align:left;" | Orlando Alves
| 42,940
| 1.20
| 0.13 
! 0
| 0 
|- style="text-align:right;"
| style="background-color: " width=5px|
| align="left"| Earth Party (MPT)
| align="left"| ALDE
| align="left"| Pedro Quartin Graça
| 24,062 
| 0.67
| 0.27 
! 0
| 0 
|- align="right"
| style="background-color: " width=5px|
| align="left"| Merit and Society Movement (MMS)
| align="left"| None 
| align="left"| Carlos Alberto Gomes
| 21,738 
| 0.61
| new
! 0
| new
|- align="right"
| style="background-color: " width=5px|
| align="left"| Humanist Party (PH)
| align="left"| None 
| align="left"| Manuela Magno
| 17,139 
| 0.48
| 0.09 
! 0
| 0 
|- align="right"
| style="background-color: " width=5px|
| align="left"| People's Monarchist Party (PPM)
| align="left"| ECPM
| align="left"| Frederico Duarte Carvalho
| 14,414 
| 0.40
| 0.05 
! 0
| 0 
|- align="right"
| style="background-color: " width=5px|
| align="left"| National Renovator Party (P.N.R.)
| align="left"| None
| align="left"| Humberto Oliveira
| 13,214 
| 0.37
| 0.12 
! 0
| 0 
|- align="right"
| style="background-color: " width=5px|
| align="left"| Workers Party of Socialist Unity (POUS)
| align="left"| None
| align="left"| Carmelinda Pereira
| 5,177 
| 0.15
| 0.02 
! 0
| 0 
|- align="right"
|- style="background-color:#E9E9E9"
| style="text-align:right;" colspan="4" | Valid votes
| 3,333,195
| 93.39
| colspan="3" rowspan="2" | 
|- style="background-color:#E9E9E9"
| style="text-align:right;" colspan="4" | Blank and invalid votes
| 235,748
| 6.61
|- style="background-color:#E9E9E9"
| style="text-align:right;" colspan="4" | Totals
| 3,568,943
| 100.00
| —
! style="background-color:#E9E9E9" |22
| 2 
|- style="background-color:#E9E9E9"
| colspan="4" | Electorate (eligible voters) and voter turnout
| 9,704,559
| 36.78
| 1.82 
| colspan="2"| 
|-
| style="text-align:left;" colspan="11" | Source: Comissão Nacional de Eleições
|}

Distribution by European group

Maps

See also 
Politics of Portugal
List of political parties in Portugal
Elections in Portugal
European Parliament
2009 European Parliament election

Notes

References

External links 
Eleição dos deputados ao Parlamento Europeu em 2009 from CNE – Comissão Nacional de Eleições

Portugal
European Parliament elections in Portugal
2009 elections in Portugal